Tuman is a studio album of Sofia Rotaru released in the very beginning of 2007. The CD includes mostly unreleased, but already aired songs, although only a selection of them. It is a multilingual album, hence traditional edition for Sofia Rotaru. It includes popular duet with Nikolay Baskov "Raspberries Blossom" and dance remix of "White Dance", which marked in 2001 a new wave in the repertoire of Sofia Rotaru. The last song of the album "One Guelder Rose (or One Snowball Tree) was one of the most popular songs of Sofia Rotaru in Ukrainian for the last three years.

Track listing

Languages of performance 
Songs 1, 18 and 19 are performed in Ukrainian language, all the other songs are performed in Russian language.

References 

2007 albums
Sofia Rotaru albums